Pincehely is a village in Tolna County, Hungary.

Famous residents
 Ferenc Hirt, (1967-), Hungarian politician, entrepreneur
 Ivett Szepesi (1986-), Hungarian handballer

External links 
 Street map 
 Webpage 

Populated places in Tolna County